The UCI Track Cycling World Championships – Women's individual pursuit is the world championship individual pursuit event held annually at the UCI Track Cycling World Championships. Rebecca Twigg of the United States, and Tamara Garkuchina of the Soviet Union are the most successful cyclists in the history of this event, with six world titles apiece. Beryl Burton, with twelve medals including five world titles, is the most decorated cyclist in the event.

Medalists

Medal table

External links
Track Cycling World Championships 2016–1893 bikecult.com
World Championship, Track, Individual pursuit, Elite cyclingarchives.com

 
Women's individual pursuit
Lists of UCI Track Cycling World Championships medalists